Varady or Várady is a surname. Notable people with the surname include:
Andreas Varady (born 1997), Slovak Hungarian jazz guitarist
Béla Várady (born 1953), Hungarian footballer
Corrin Varady, Australian journalist
Jenő Várady (1899–?), Hungarian rower
Júlia Várady (born 1941), German opera singer
Krista Varady, Canadian-American nutrition researcher
Rozsi Varady (1902–1933), Hungarian-American cellist
Tibor Várady (born 1939), Professor of Law

See also
Varadi

Hungarian-language surnames